The knob-billed duck (Sarkidiornis melanotos), or African comb duck, is a duck found in tropical wetlands in Sub-Saharan Africa, Madagascar and the Indian Subcontinent from northern India to Laos and extreme southern China.

Most taxonomic authorities split this species and the comb duck from each other. The supposed extinct "Mauritian comb duck" is based on misidentified remains of the Mauritius sheldgoose (Alopochen mauritiana); this was realized as early as 1897, but the mistaken identity can still occasionally be found in recent sources.

Description and systematics
This common species is unmistakable. It is one of the largest species of duck. Adults have a white head freckled with dark spots, and a pure white neck and underparts. The upperparts are glossy blue-black upperparts, with bluish and greenish iridescence especially prominent on the secondaries (lower arm feathers). The male is much larger than the female, and has a large black knob on the bill. Young birds are dull buff below and on the face and neck, with dull brown upperparts, top of the head and eyestripe. Knob-billed ducks are generally larger in size when compared to comb ducks, and flanks are usually lighter (light grey, in females sometimes whitish).

Immature knob-billed ducks look like a large greyish female of the cotton pygmy goose (Nettapus coromandelicus) and may be difficult to tell apart if no other birds are around to compare size and hue. However, knob-billed ducks in immature plumage are rarely seen without adults nearby and thus they are usually easily identified too.

The knob-billed duck is silent except for a low croak when flushed.

Gallery

Uncertainty surrounds the correct systematic placement of this species. Initially, it was placed in the dabbling duck subfamily Anatinae. Later, it was assigned to the "perching ducks", a paraphyletic assemblage of waterfowl most of which are intermediate between dabbling ducks and shelducks. As the "perching ducks" were split up, the knob-billed duck was moved to the Tadorninae or shelduck subfamily.

Analysis of mtDNA sequences of the cytochrome b and NADH dehydrogenase subunit 2 genes, however, suggests that it is a quite basal member of the Anatidae, vindicating the earliest placement. But its closest living relatives cannot be resolved to satisfaction without further study.

Ecology
It breeds in still freshwater swamps and lakes in the tropics. It is largely resident, apart from dispersion in the wet season.

This duck feeds on vegetation by grazing or dabbling and to a lesser extent on small fish, invertebrates, and seeds. It can become a problem to rice farmers. Knob-billed ducks often perch in trees. They are typically seen in flocks, small in the wet season, up to 100 in the dry season. Sometimes they separate according to sex.

The knob-billed duck is declining in numbers locally, but due to its wide range it is not considered globally threatened by the IUCN. It is one of the species to which the Agreement on the Conservation of African-Eurasian Migratory Waterbirds applies.

Reproduction
African birds breed during and after the rainy season and may not breed if the rain is scanty. Knob-billed ducks nest mainly in tree holes, also in tall grass.

Males may have two mates at once or up to five in succession. They defend the females and young but not the nest sites.

Females lay 7 to 15 yellowish-white eggs.

References

External links
 Species text in The Atlas of Southern African Birds.

Sarkidiornis
Birds of Sub-Saharan Africa
Birds of India
Birds of Southeast Asia
knob-billed duck
Taxa named by Thomas Pennant